The  is a high-speed shinkansen service  between  and  in Japan, operated by the East Japan Railway Company (JR East) since March 1997. It is the only shinkansen service that runs on the Akita Shinkansen, and uses E6 series trains. After Morioka, the Komachi service continues along standard gauge tracks that were converted from narrow gauge.

The Komachi service was named after a famous poet from the area, Ono no Komachi, whose name (小町) is also synonymous with "belle" or "beauty" in Japanese.

Station stops
Komachi services stop at the following stations on the Akita Shinkansen between Morioka and Akita. For details of station stops between Tokyo and Morioka, see the Hayabusa articles.

 
 *
 
 
 
 
(*) Not served by all trains.

Train formations

Car 11, the "Green" (first class) car, is at the Tokyo end. All seats are reserved and no-smoking.

E3 series

Komachi services were also operated by five-car E3 series trainsets (later augmented to six cars). These sets were formed as shown below, with car 11, the "Green" (first class) car, at the Tokyo end. All seats were reserved and no-smoking.

Accommodation

History
The name Komachi was officially announced in July 1996. Services initially consisted of 13 return workings daily between Tokyo and Akita, and one return working between Sendai and Akita. The train services proved popular, and from the December 1998 timetable revision, an addition return working was added, and the E3 series trains were lengthened to six cars each. From the December 1999 timetable, all Komachi services ran together with E2 series Yamabiko trains, allowing overall journey times to be reduced, with a typical journey time of 4 hours 4 minutes.

Initially, a fleet of four trains was used to operate four return services daily between Tokyo and Akita. The fastest journey time was reduced to 3 hours 45 minutes, 5 minutes faster than the fastest previous Komachi services. From the start of the revised timetable on 15 March 2014, all services were operated by E6 series trains, and the name was returned to simply Komachi.

See also
 Akita Relay, a temporary limited express service that operated to Akita while the Akita Shinkansen was being constructed
 List of named passenger trains of Japan

References

External links

 JR East E6 series Komachi 

Akita Shinkansen
Named passenger trains of Japan
Passenger trains running at least at 300 km/h in commercial operations
Railway services introduced in 1997
Tōhoku Shinkansen
1997 establishments in Japan
Named Shinkansen trains